Yenişehir District may refer to:
 Yenişehir, Bursa
 Yenişehir, Mersin
 Yenişehir, Diyarbakır